Tiga Talk! is a Canadian children's television series featuring a wolf cub puppet called Tiga. Produced for the Aboriginal Peoples Television Network in Canada, the show uses puppets and live-action stories to explore First Nations culture.

Cast
Irene Green as Kokum
Art Napoleon as Dad
Kate-La Faith Hanuse as Jodie
Michaela Fraser as Kimmie
Gabriel Paul as Jason
Shauntelle Dick-Charleson as Alice
Isaac Elijah as Jack
Kyra Heberlein as Tessa
Calvin Cooke as Kyle

Puppeteers
Brian Culp - Tiga the Wolf
Ingrid Hansen - Gertie the Gopher
Steve Barker operates Gavin the Canada Goose
Rob Hunter

Location
Filming occurs at various locations including the city of Victoria, Little Raven pre-school, Kuper Island First Nations and Nitinat Lake

Episodes
There are four seasons of Tiga Talk! included six episodes in 2008, thirteen episodes in 2009, thirteen episodes in 2010, and eleven episodes in 2011.

Season 1: (2008)
 Shh is for Sharing
 Fuh is for Friends
 SSS is for Smiling
 Guh is for Growing
 LLL is for Listening
 CCC is for Caring

Season 2: (2009)
 Dreams
 Birthdays
 Keep Trying
 Dwellings
 Dance
 Safety
 Food
 Food Preparation
 Exercise
 Spring
 Summer
 Fall
 Winter

Season 3: (2010)
 Building
 Appreciate the World We See
 Listen to the World
 Remembering the Past
 Keep Smiling
 Competition
 Dressing Up
 Making Music
 Trees
 Babies
 Treasures
 Giving Gifts
 Camping

Season 4: (2011)
 Laughter
 Hands and Feet
 Tiga and Hiccups
 Moving
 Do It On My Own
 I Feel Left Out
 Where Is It?
 I Want A Pet
 What Shall I Wear
 Who's That?
 Cook Out!

References

External links 
 Official website
 Tiga Talk iPhone App
 Tiga Talk Facebook Fan Page
 Tiga Talks Twitter Stream
 ''Tiga Talks Vimeo Video Channel
 Tiga Talk Premier Press Release
 APTN

2000s Canadian children's television series
2010s Canadian children's television series
2000s Canadian comedy television series
2010s Canadian comedy television series
2000s preschool education television series
2010s preschool education television series
2008 Canadian television series debuts
2011 Canadian television series endings
Canadian children's comedy television series
Canadian children's musical television series
Canadian preschool education television series
Canadian television shows featuring puppetry
Aboriginal Peoples Television Network original programming
Television series about wolves
Television shows set in Canada
First Nations television series